Chirodella is an extinct genus of conodonts in the family Prioniodinidae.

References 

 Two new genera Comperniodontella n. gen. and Galeodontella n. gen., and new multielement of Chirodella Hirschmann, 1959 and Cypridodella Mosher, 1968 (Conodonta) from the Mamonia Complex (Upper Triassic), Cyprus. Christopher C. Ryley and Lars E. Fahraeus, Neues Jahrbuch fuer Geologie und Palaeontologie Abhandlungen, 1994, volume 1931, pages 21–54

External links 

 
 

Prioniodinida genera
Triassic conodonts